Outside Inside is the sixth studio album by The Tubes, released in 1983. It was the second album by the group to be released by Capitol Records. The album was produced by David Foster. The Tubes had their biggest radio hit with the single from this album, "She's a Beauty".

Early US copies of the album used embossed lettering for the eye chart on the front cover. This made the lettering hard to read. A later version of the cover had the eye chart along with artist and title information printed in red and blue.

There are 2 different versions of the song "The Monkey Time". The original included guest vocals from Martha Davis of The Motels. Other copies used a version with Davis' vocal replaced by Michele Gray. Gray was one of The Tubes principal dancers from 1983–1985, and later married frequent Tubes collaborator and producer Todd Rundgren.

Track listing

Side 1
"She's a Beauty" (Foster, Waybill, Lukather) – 4:01
"No Not Again"  	              (Tubes) – 3:28
"Out of the Business"  	      (Tubes) – 3:30
"The Monkey Time"   (Curtis Mayfield, Tubes) – 3:54
"Glass House"                        (Tubes) – 3:31

Side 2
"Wild Women of Wongo"                (Tubes) – 3:57
"Tip of My Tongue"     (M. White, M. Snyder) – 3:58
"Fantastic Delusion"                 (Tubes) – 3:54
"Drums"                              (Tubes) – 2:21
"Theme Park"                         (Tubes) – 3:13
"Outside Lookin' Inside"             (Tubes) - 0:57

Release history

The Michele Gray version of "The Monkey Time" was also used on the Capitol CD issue of the album.

In 2012 Iconclassic reissued the album with the original version of "The Monkey Time" featuring Davis. The reissue also included bonus tracks including B-sides that had never been previously released on CD. The CD was remastered by Vic Anesini and featured extensive liner notes and commentary from band members.

The bonus tracks include:

"When You're Ready to Come" (B-side of a single from the album)
"Keyboard Kids"
"Satellite" (an alternate version previously appeared on Bill Spooner's 1980's solo album "First Chud")
"The Monkey Time" (single version featuring Michele Gray on vocals)

Personnel
The Tubes
Rick Anderson - Bass
Michael Cotten	- Synthesizer
Mingo Lewis - Percussion
Prairie Prince - Drums, Producer, Art Direction
Bill Spooner - Guitar, Vocals
Roger Steen - Guitar, Vocals
Fee Waybill - Vocals, Mixing
Vince Welnick - Keyboards

Additional personnel

Maurice White
Patti Austin -   Background vocals
Stacy Baird	-     Producer, Engineer
Bob Bullock	-     Assistant Engineer
Bill Burks -	     Contribution
Bill Champlin  - Background vocals
David Cole	-     Engineer
Martha Davis -	     Vocals
Nathan East -    Bass
Larry Ferguson  -    Assistant Engineer
Chuck Findley	-     Horn
David Foster  -  Keyboards, Producer
Tom Fouce	-     Assistant Engineer
Humberto Gatica  -   Engineer, Mixing
Gary Grant	-     Horn
Jay Graydon
Gary Herbig	-     Horn
Jerry Hey -      Arranger, Horn
James Newton Howard - Keyboards
Gregg Jampol  -	     Assistant Engineer
Howard Johnston -    Assistant Engineer
Ken Kessie	-     Engineer
Bobby Kimball	-     Background vocals
Dennis Kirk	-     Engineer
Jeff Kliment	-     Assistant Engineer
Paul Knotter	 -    Collaboration
Roy Kohara	-     Art Direction
Greg Ladanyi -	     Mixing
Jack Leahy	-     Engineer
Steve Lukather - Guitar
George Massenburg -  Mixing
Jim McCrary	 -     Photography
Marnie Moore -	     Assistant Engineer
David Paich -	     Keyboards
Steve Porcaro -	     Keyboards
Bill Reichenbach Jr. - Horn
Barbara Rooney	-     Assistant Engineer
Freddy Washington  - Bass
Jim Welch -	     Contribution
David Williams -	     Guitar 
Larry Williams -	     Horn
Gene Wooley -	     Assistant Engineer

Charts

References

External links
Outside Inside on Discogs.com

The Tubes albums
1983 albums
Albums produced by David Foster
Capitol Records albums